Mam Zineh (also Romanized as Mām Zīneh; also known as Mameh Zīneh) is a village in Melkari Rural District, Vazineh District, Sardasht County, West Azerbaijan Province, Iran. At the 2006 census, its population was 218, in 31 families.

References 

Populated places in Sardasht County